Walter Theodore "Sonny" Rollins (born September 7, 1930) is an American jazz tenor saxophonist who is widely recognized as one of the most important and influential jazz musicians. In a seven-decade career, he has recorded over sixty albums as a leader. A number of his compositions, including "St. Thomas", "Oleo", "Doxy", "Pent-Up House", and "Airegin", have become jazz standards.  Rollins has been called "the greatest living improviser" and the "Saxophone Colossus".

Early life
Rollins was born in New York City to parents from the United States Virgin Islands. The youngest of three siblings, he grew up in central Harlem and on Sugar Hill, receiving his first alto saxophone at the age of seven or eight.  He attended Edward W. Stitt Junior High School and graduated from Benjamin Franklin High School in East Harlem.  Rollins started as a pianist, changed to alto saxophone, and finally switched to tenor in 1946. During his high school years, he played in a band with other future jazz legends Jackie McLean, Kenny Drew, and Art Taylor.

Later life and career

1949–1956
After graduating from high school in 1948, Rollins began performing professionally; he made his first recordings in early 1949 as a sideman with the bebop singer Babs Gonzales (trombonist J. J. Johnson was the arranger of the group).  Within the next few months, he began to make a name for himself, recording with Johnson and appearing under the leadership of pianist Bud Powell, alongside trumpeter Fats Navarro and drummer Roy Haynes, on a seminal "hard bop" session.

In early 1950, Rollins was arrested for armed robbery and spent ten months in Rikers Island jail before being released on parole; in 1952, he was re-arrested for violating the terms of his parole by using heroin.  Between 1951 and 1953, he recorded with Miles Davis, the Modern Jazz Quartet, Charlie Parker, and Thelonious Monk.  A breakthrough arrived in 1954 when he recorded his famous compositions "Oleo", "Airegin", and "Doxy" with a quintet led by Davis that also featured pianist Horace Silver, these recordings appearing on the album Bags' Groove.

In 1955, Rollins entered the Federal Medical Center, Lexington, at the time the only assistance in the U.S. for drug addicts. While there, he volunteered for then-experimental methadone therapy and was able to break his heroin habit, after which he lived for a time in Chicago, briefly rooming with the trumpeter Booker Little. Rollins initially feared sobriety would impair his musicianship, but then went on to greater success.

Rollins briefly joined the Miles Davis Quintet in the summer of 1955.  Later that year, he joined the Clifford Brown–Max Roach quintet; studio albums documenting his time in the band are Clifford Brown and Max Roach at Basin Street and Sonny Rollins Plus 4. After the deaths of Brown and the band's pianist, Richie Powell, in a June 1956 automobile accident, Rollins continued playing with Roach and began releasing albums under his own name on Prestige Records, Blue Note, Riverside, and the Los Angeles label Contemporary.

His widely acclaimed album Saxophone Colossus was recorded on June 22, 1956, at Rudy Van Gelder's studio in New Jersey, with Tommy Flanagan on piano, former Jazz Messengers bassist Doug Watkins, and his favorite drummer, Roach. This was Rollins's sixth recording as a leader and it included his best-known composition "St. Thomas", a Caribbean calypso based on "Hold him Joe" a tune sung to him by his mother in his childhood, as well as the fast bebop number "Strode Rode", and "Moritat" (the Kurt Weill composition also known as "Mack the Knife").  A long blues solo on Saxophone Colossus, "Blue 7", was analyzed in depth by the composer and critic Gunther Schuller in a 1958 article.

In the solo for "St. Thomas", Rollins uses repetition of a rhythmic pattern, and variations of that pattern, covering only a few tones in a tight range, and employing staccato and semi-detached notes. This is interrupted by a sudden flourish, utilizing a much wider range before returning to the former pattern. (Listen to the music sample.)  In his book The Jazz Style of Sonny Rollins, David N. Baker explains that Rollins "very often uses rhythm for its own sake. He will sometimes improvise on a rhythmic pattern instead of on the melody or changes."  Ever since recording "St. Thomas", Rollins's use of calypso rhythms has been one of his signature contributions to jazz; he often performs traditional Caribbean tunes such as "Hold 'Em Joe" and "Don't Stop the Carnival", and he has written many original calypso-influenced compositions, such as "Duke of Iron", "The Everywhere Calypso", and "Global Warming".

In 1957 he married the actress and model Dawn Finney.

In 1956 he also recorded Tenor Madness, using Davis's group – pianist Red Garland, bassist Paul Chambers, and drummer Philly Joe Jones. The title track is the only recording of Rollins with John Coltrane, who was also a member of Davis's group.

At the end of the year Rollins appeared as a sideman on Thelonious Monk's album Brilliant Corners and also recorded his own first album for Blue Note Records, entitled Sonny Rollins, Volume One, with Donald Byrd on trumpet, Wynton Kelly on piano, Gene Ramey on bass, and Roach on drums.

1957–spring 1959
In 1957, Rollins pioneered the use of bass and drums, without piano, as accompaniment for his saxophone solos, a texture that came to be known as "strolling". Two early tenor/bass/drums trio recordings are Way Out West and A Night at the Village Vanguard, both recorded in 1957. Way Out West was so named because it was recorded for California-based Contemporary Records (with Los Angeles drummer Shelly Manne), and because it included country and western songs such as "Wagon Wheels" and "I'm an Old Cowhand". The Village Vanguard album consists of two sets, a matinee with bassist Donald Bailey and drummer Pete LaRoca and an evening set with bassist Wilbur Ware and drummer Elvin Jones. Rollins used the trio format intermittently throughout his career, sometimes taking the unusual step of using his sax as a rhythm section instrument during bass and drum solos.  Lew Tabackin cited Rollins's pianoless trio as an inspiration to lead his own.  Joe Henderson, David S. Ware, Joe Lovano, Branford Marsalis, and Joshua Redman have also led pianoless sax trios.

While in Los Angeles in 1957, Rollins met alto saxophonist Ornette Coleman and the two of them practiced together.  Coleman, a pioneer of free jazz, stopped using a pianist in his own band two years later.

By this time, Rollins had become well known for taking relatively banal or unconventional songs (such as "There's No Business Like Show Business" on Work Time, "Toot, Toot, Tootsie" on The Sound of Sonny, and later "Sweet Leilani" on the Grammy-winning album This Is What I Do) and using them as vehicles for improvisation.

Rollins acquired the nickname "Newk" because of his facial resemblance to Brooklyn Dodgers star pitcher Don Newcombe.

In 1957 he made his Carnegie Hall debut and recorded again for Blue Note with Johnson on trombone, Horace Silver or Monk on piano and drummer Art Blakey (released as Sonny Rollins, Volume Two).  That December, he and fellow tenor saxophonist Sonny Stitt were featured together on Dizzy Gillespie's album Sonny Side Up.

In 1958, he appeared in Art Kane's A Great Day in Harlem photograph of jazz musicians in New York; he is one of only two surviving musicians from the photo (the other being Benny Golson).

The same year, Rollins recorded another landmark piece for saxophone, bass and drums trio: Freedom Suite. His original sleeve notes said, "How ironic that the Negro, who more than any other people can claim America's culture as his own, is being persecuted and repressed; that the Negro, who has exemplified the humanities in his very existence, is being rewarded with inhumanity." The title track is a nineteen-minute improvised bluesy suite; the other side of the album features hard bop workouts of popular show tunes. Oscar Pettiford and Max Roach provided bass and drums, respectively. The LP was available only briefly in its original form, before the record company repackaged it as Shadow Waltz, the title of another piece on the record.

Following Sonny Rollins and the Big Brass (Sonny Rollins Brass/Sonny Rollins Trio), Rollins made one more studio album in 1958, Sonny Rollins and the Contemporary Leaders, before taking a three-year break from recording. This was a session for Contemporary Records and saw Rollins recording an esoteric mixture of tunes including "Rock-a-Bye Your Baby with a Dixie Melody" with a West Coast group made up of pianist Hampton Hawes, guitarist Barney Kessel, bassist Leroy Vinnegar and drummer Shelly Manne.

In 1959 he toured Europe for the first time, performing in Sweden, the Netherlands, Germany, Italy, and France.

Summer 1959–fall 1961: The Bridge
By 1959, Rollins had become frustrated with what he perceived as his own musical limitations and took the first – and most famous – of his musical sabbaticals. While living on the Lower East Side of Manhattan, he ventured to the pedestrian walkway of the Williamsburg Bridge to practice, in order to avoid disturbing a neighboring expectant mother.  Today, a fifteen-story apartment building named "The Rollins" stands on the Grand Street site where he lived.  Almost every day from the summer of 1959 through the end of 1961, Rollins practiced on the bridge, next to the subway tracks. Rollins admitted that he would often practice for 15 or 16 hours a day, no matter what season. In the summer of 1961, the journalist Ralph Berton happened to pass by the saxophonist on the bridge one day and published an article in Metronome magazine about the occurrence.  During this period, Rollins became a dedicated practitioner of yoga.  Rollins ended his sabbatical in November 1961.  He later said "I could have probably spent the rest of my life just going up on the bridge. I realized, no, I have to get back into the real world." In 2016, a campaign was initiated that seeks to have the bridge renamed in Rollins's honor.

Winter 1961–1969: Musical explorations
In November 1961, Rollins returned to the jazz scene with a residency at the Jazz Gallery in Greenwich Village; in March, 1962, he appeared on Ralph Gleason's television series Jazz Casual.  During the 1960s, he lived on Willoughby Street in Brooklyn, New York.

He named his 1962 "comeback" album The Bridge at the start of a contract with RCA Victor.  Produced by George Avakian, the disc was recorded with a quartet featuring guitarist Jim Hall, Ben Riley on drums, and bassist Bob Cranshaw. This became one of Rollins's best-selling records; in 2015 it was inducted into the Grammy Hall of Fame.

Rollins's contract with RCA Victor lasted through 1964. Each album he recorded differed radically from the previous one.  The 1962 disc What's New? explored Latin rhythms.  On the album Our Man in Jazz, recorded live at The Village Gate, he explored avant-garde playing with a quartet that featured Cranshaw on bass, Billy Higgins on drums and Don Cherry on cornet.  He also played with a tenor saxophone hero, Coleman Hawkins, and free jazz pianist Paul Bley on Sonny Meets Hawk!, and he re-examined jazz standards and Great American Songbook melodies on Now's the Time and The Standard Sonny Rollins (which featured pianist Herbie Hancock).

In 1963, he made the first of many tours of Japan.

In 2007, recordings from a 1965 residency at Ronnie Scott's Jazz Club were released by the Harkit label as Live in London; they offer a very different picture of Rollins's playing from the studio albums of the period. (These are unauthorized releases, and Rollins has responded by "bootlegging" them himself and releasing them on his website.)

Upon signing with Impulse! Records, he released a soundtrack to the 1966 film Alfie,  as well as There Will Never Be Another You and Sonny Rollins on Impulse!  After East Broadway Run Down (1966), which featured trumpeter Freddie Hubbard, bassist Jimmy Garrison, and drummer Elvin Jones, Rollins did not release another studio album for six years.

In 1968, he was the subject of a television documentary (in the series Creative Persons), directed by Dick Fontaine, entitled Who is Sonny Rollins?

1969–1971: Second sabbatical

In 1969, Rollins took another two-year sabbatical from public performance.  During this hiatus period, he visited Jamaica for the first time and spent several months studying yoga, meditation, and Eastern philosophies at an ashram in Powai, India, a district of Mumbai.

1971–2000
 He returned from his second sabbatical with a performance in Kongsberg, Norway, in 1971.  Reviewing a March 1972 performance at New York's Village Vanguard night club, The New Yorker critic Whitney Balliett wrote that Rollins "had changed again.  He had become a whirlwind.  His runs roared, and there were jarring staccato passages and furious double-time spurts.  He seemed to be shouting and gesticulating on his horn, as if he were waving his audience into battle."  The same year, he released Next Album and moved to Germantown, New York.  Also in 1972, he was awarded a Guggenheim Fellowship in composition.

During the 1970s and 1980s, he also became drawn to R&B, pop, and funk rhythms. Some of his bands during this period featured electric guitar, electric bass, and usually more pop- or funk-oriented drummers.

In 1974, Rollins added jazz bagpiper Rufus Harley to his band; the group was filmed performing live at Ronnie Scott's in London.  For most of this period Rollins was recorded by producer Orrin Keepnews for Milestone Records (the compilation Silver City: A Celebration of 25 Years on Milestone contains a selection from these years). In 1978 he, McCoy Tyner, Ron Carter, and Al Foster toured together as the Milestone Jazzstars. In June of that year he joined many other major jazz artists in a performance for President Jimmy Carter on the South Lawn of the White House.

It was also during this period that Rollins's passion for unaccompanied saxophone solos came to the forefront.  In 1979 he played unaccompanied on The Tonight Show and in 1985 he released The Solo Album, recorded live at the Museum of Modern Art in New York.  He also frequently played long, extemporaneous unaccompanied cadenzas during performances with his band; a prime example is his introduction to the tune "Autumn Nocturne" on the 1978 album Don't Stop the Carnival.

By the 1980s, Rollins had stopped playing small nightclubs and was appearing mainly in concert halls or outdoor arenas; through the late 1990s he occasionally performed at large New York rock clubs such as Tramps and The Bottom Line.  He added (uncredited) sax improvisations to three tracks by the Rolling Stones for their 1981 album Tattoo You, including the single, "Waiting on a Friend" and the long jam "Slave".  That November, he led a saxophone masterclass on French television.  In 1983, he was honored as a "Jazz Master" by the National Endowment for the Arts.

In 1986, documentary filmmaker Robert Mugge released a film titled Saxophone Colossus.  It featured two Rollins performances: a quintet concert at Opus 40 in upstate New York and a performance with the Yomiuri Shimbun Orchestra in Japan of his Concerto for Saxophone and Symphony, a work composed in collaboration with the Finnish pianist and composer Heikki Sarmanto.

In 1993, the Sonny Rollins International Jazz Archives opened at the University of Pittsburgh.

New York City Hall proclaimed November 13, 1995, to be "Sonny Rollins Day". Several days later, Rollins gave a performance at New York City's Beacon Theatre that reunited him with musicians with whom he played as a teenager, including McLean, Walter Bishop Jr., Percy Heath, Connie Henry, and Gil Coggins.

In 1997, he was voted "Jazz Artist of the Year" in the Down Beat magazine critics' poll.  The following year, Rollins, a dedicated advocate of environmentalism, released an album entitled Global Warming.

2001–2012

Critics such as Gary Giddins and Stanley Crouch have noted the disparity between Rollins the recording artist, and Rollins the concert artist. In a May 2005 New Yorker profile, Crouch wrote of Rollins the concert artist:

Rollins won a 2001 Grammy Award for Best Jazz Instrumental Album for This Is What I Do (2000). On September 11, 2001, the 71-year-old Rollins, who lived several blocks away, heard the World Trade Center collapse, and was forced to evacuate his Greenwich Street apartment, with only his saxophone in hand. Although he was shaken, he traveled to Boston five days later to play a concert at the Berklee School of Music. The live recording of that performance was released on CD in 2005 as Without a Song: The 9/11 Concert, which won the 2006 Grammy for Jazz Instrumental Solo for Rollins's performance of "Why Was I Born?"

Rollins was presented with a Grammy Award for lifetime achievement in 2004; that year also saw the death of his wife, Lucille.

In 2006, Rollins went on to complete a Down Beat Readers Poll triple win for: "Jazzman of the Year", "#1 Tenor Sax Player", and "Recording of the Year" for the CD Without a Song: The 9/11 Concert. The band that year featured his nephew, trombonist Clifton Anderson, and included bassist Cranshaw, pianist Stephen Scott, percussionist Kimati Dinizulu, and drummer Perry Wilson.

After a successful Japanese tour Rollins returned to the recording studio for the first time in five years to record the Grammy-nominated CD Sonny, Please (2006). The CD title is derived from one of his wife's favorite phrases. The album was released on Rollins's own label, Doxy Records, following his departure from Milestone Records after many years and was produced by Anderson. Rollins's band at this time, and on this album, included Cranshaw, guitarist Bobby Broom, drummer Steve Jordan and Dinizulu.

During these years, Rollins regularly toured worldwide, playing major venues throughout Europe, South America, the Far East, and Australasia; he is estimated to have sometimes earned as much as $100,000 per performance.  On September 18, 2007, he performed at Carnegie Hall in commemoration of the fiftieth anniversary of his first performance there. Appearing with him were Anderson (trombone), Bobby Broom (guitar), Cranshaw (bass), Dinizulu (percussion), Roy Haynes (drums) and Christian McBride (bass).

Around 2000, Rollins began recording many of his live performances; since then, he has archived recordings of over two hundred and fifty concerts.  To date, four albums have been released from these archives on Doxy Records and Okeh Records: Road Shows, Vol. 1;  Road Shows, Vol. 2 (with four tracks documenting his 80th birthday concert, which included Rollins's first ever recorded appearance with Ornette Coleman on the twenty-minute "Sonnymoon for Two"); Road Shows, Vol. 3;  and Holding the Stage, released in April 2016.

In 2010 Rollins was awarded the National Medal of Arts and the Edward MacDowell Medal; in the fall of the same year he celebrated his 80th birthday with a concert at New York's Beacon Theatre that included a guest appearance by Ornette Coleman.  The following year he was the subject of another documentary by Dick Fontaine, entitled Beyond the Notes.

Rollins has not performed in public since 2012, and retired in 2014, due to recurring respiratory issues.

2013–present
In 2013, Rollins moved to Woodstock, New York. That spring, he made a guest television appearance on The Simpsons in "Whiskey Business" and received an honorary Doctor of Music degree from the Juilliard School in New York City.

In 2014 he was the subject of a Dutch television documentary entitled Sonny Rollins-Morgen Speel ik Beter. He made a public appearance in June of that year introducing saxophonist Ornette Coleman at an all-star tribute performance to Coleman in Brooklyn, NY. In October 2015, he received the Jazz Foundation of America's lifetime achievement award.

In the spring of 2017, Rollins donated his personal archive to the Schomburg Center for Research in Black Culture, one of the research centers of New York Public Library. Later that year, he endowed the "Sonny Rollins Jazz Ensemble Fund" at Oberlin College, in "recognition of the institution's long legacy of access and social justice advocacy."

In February 2023, Rollins sold his music catalogue to Reservoir Media.

Influences
As a saxophonist he had initially been attracted to the jump and R&B sounds of performers like Louis Jordan, but soon became drawn into the mainstream tenor saxophone tradition. The German critic Joachim-Ernst Berendt described this tradition as sitting between the two poles of the strong sonority of Coleman Hawkins and the light flexible phrasing of Lester Young, which did so much to inspire the fleet improvisation of bebop in the 1950s.  Other tenor saxophone influences include Ben Webster and Don Byas.  By his mid-teens, Rollins became heavily influenced by alto saxophonist Charlie Parker.  During his high school years, he was mentored by the pianist and composer Thelonious Monk, often rehearsing at Monk's apartment.

Instruments
Rollins has played, at various times, a Selmer Mark VI tenor saxophone and a Buescher Aristocrat.  During the 1970s he recorded on soprano saxophone for the album Easy Living.  His preferred mouthpieces are made by Otto Link and Berg Larsen.  He uses Frederick Hemke medium reeds.

Discography

Decorations and awards
 Elected to the Down Beat Jazz Hall of Fame (1973)
 Honorary Doctor of Arts from Bard College (1992)
 Honorary Doctor of Music from Wesleyan University (1998)
 Honorary Doctor of Music from Long Island University (1998)
 Honorary Doctor of Music from Duke University (1999)
 Honorary Doctor of Music from New England Conservatory of Music (2002)
 Honorary Doctor of Music from Berklee College of Music (2003)
 Grammy Award for lifetime achievement (2004)
 Golden Plate Award of the American Academy of Achievement presented by Awards Council member Kareem Abdul-Jabbar (2006)
 Minneapolis, Minnesota officially named October 31, 2006 after Rollins in honor of his achievements and contributions to the world of jazz
 Polar Music Prize "for over 50 years one of the most powerful and personal voices in jazz" (2007)
 Honorary Doctor of Music from Colby College(2007)
 Austrian Cross of Honour for Science and Art, 1st class (2009)
 Honorary Doctor of Music from Rutgers University (2009)
 National Medal of Arts (2010)
 Miles Davis Award at the Montreal Jazz Festival (2010) 
 Elected to the American Academy of Arts and Sciences (2010)
 Edward MacDowell Medal (2010)
 Kennedy Center Honors on his 81st birthday (September 7, 2011)
 Honorary Doctor of Music from the Juilliard School (May 2013)
Honorary Doctor of Music from the University of Hartford (2015)

References

Further reading

Articles
Giardello, Joe (June–July 1995). "Sonny Rollins: Our Man in Jazz". Coda. pp. 8–11.
Goldberg, Joe (June 10, 2000). "Jazz: Sonny at 70". Billboard. pp. 66, 72.
"With a Song in His Heart". Yoga Journal. May 2006. pp. 119–120
King, Daniel (June 11, 2020). "Sonny Rollins on the Pandemic, Protests and Music". The New Yorker.

Books
Blancq, Charles. Sonny Rollins: The Journey of a Jazzman. Boston: Twayne, 1983.
Blumenthal, Bob, and John Abbott. Saxophone Colossus: A Portrait of Sonny Rollins. New York: Abrams, 2010.
Broecking, Christian. Sonny Rollins: Improvisation und Protest. Creative People Books / Broecking Verlag, 2010.
Médioni, Franck. Sonny Rollins: Le Souffle Continu. Paris: Editions MF, 2016.
Nisenson, Eric. Open Sky, Sonny Rollins and his World of Improvisation. New York: St. Martin's Press, 2000.
Palmer, Richard. Sonny Rollins: The Cutting Edge. New York: Bloomsbury, 2004.
Theard, Christine Marie. It's All Good: Colossal Conversations with Sonny Rollins. They Are Divine Books, 2018.
Wilson, Peter Niklas. Sonny Rollins: The Definitive Musical Guide. Berkeley: Berkeley Hills Books, 2001.
Wyatt, Hugh. Sonny Rollins: Meditating on a Riff. New York: Kamama Books, 2018.

External links

Sonny Rollins Biography and Interview on American Academy of Achievement
Detailed Discography at Jazzdisco.org
Sonny Rollins papers, 1910s-2015 Schomburg Center for Research in Black Culture, The New York Public Library.
Sonny Rollins audiovisual collection from his personal holdings Schomburg Center for Research in Black Culture, The New York Public Library.

1930 births
Living people
African-American jazz composers
African-American jazz musicians
African-American woodwind musicians
American jazz bandleaders
American jazz tenor saxophonists
American male saxophonists
American people of United States Virgin Islands descent
Bebop saxophonists
Blue Note Records artists
Contemporary Records artists
Grammy Lifetime Achievement Award winners
Hard bop saxophonists
Impulse! Records artists
Kennedy Center honorees
Milestone Records artists
Musicians from New York City
Prestige Records artists
Recipients of the Austrian Cross of Honour for Science and Art, 1st class
RCA Victor artists
United States National Medal of Arts recipients
Verve Records artists
Jazz musicians from New York (state)
21st-century saxophonists
American male jazz composers
American jazz composers
Miles Davis Quintet members
Okeh Records artists
EmArcy Records artists